Carrie is an American horror media franchise, based on the 1974 novel of the same name by author Stephen King. The series consists of four films, a Broadway musical and a television special.

Novel 

In the novel, a slightly overweight, shy, and usually bullied girl named Carietta White is being raised by Margaret, an unstable religious fanatic who thinks almost everything could be sinful. When Carrie gets her first period in the shower, she panics as Margaret never taught her to prepare for having a period. Christine Hargensen and Susan Snell ringlead the other girls to chant "period" and stare at Carrie. A few of the girls even throw tampons, further confusing Carrie, who believes she is dying. The gym teacher, Rita Desjardin, punishes the girls with a week of detention and suspends Chris when she refuses to comply. Desjardin also sends Carrie home with Margaret, believing Carrie should confront her mother about it. Margaret locks Carrie in the 'praying closet', as Margaret believes that periods are a symbol of a sexual sin on Carrie's part. However, she lets Carrie out much earlier than she does normally, and Carrie believes it is because she seems to have telekinesis-like abilities.

Meanwhile, Chris feels as if she should not be suspended and decides to have revenge on Carrie. Sue, however, feels bad about her part in the incident and wants to apologize, but is too nervous to do so. Sue tells her boyfriend Thomas Ross to ask Carrie to prom, noting that Carrie has a crush on Tommy. Carrie originally thinks that the invitation was a means of tricking her, but Tommy pleads, and Carrie realizes that his invitation is genuine and accepts; she then sews herself a beautiful white dress for prom. Meanwhile, Chris and her boyfriend Billy Nolan collect pigs’ blood in a bucket and hang it over the auditorium stage. Chris employs her friend Tina Blake to make fake Prom Queen ballots with Carrie’s name on them so that the blood will dump on Carrie and humiliate her. On prom night, Margaret initially forbids Carrie to attend prom, claiming that Tommy and the others will laugh at her, but Carrie is tired of her mother controlling her life and shoves her mother into the ‘praying closet’ with her powers. At prom, the blood is dumped on Carrie, but in the process the bucket holding the blood hits Tommy on the head, causing him to die of blood loss.

Carrie flees, but then remembers her powers and locks the prom doors with them. She causes a fire and thwarts any attempt to put out her fire, killing multiple students and teachers. Carrie returns home, where Margaret tells Carrie how she was conceived: through a bizarre form of marital rape. Margaret then comes to the conclusion that Carrie's powers come from Satan and stabs her with a knife. Carrie telekinetically stops Margaret's heart in an attempt to save herself, but is immediately regretful. Carrie attempts to flee, but she is bleeding so heavily from the stab wound that she can barely walk. Sue finds Carrie, and after a brief telepathic conversation, Carrie forgives Sue. Soon after, Carrie dies crying out to her mother.

Films

Carrie (1976)

The Rage: Carrie 2

Carrie (2002)

Carrie (2013)

Television

Special 

A television special of The CW series Riverdale, based on Carrie: The Musical, from the series second season episode titled "Chapter Thirty-One: A Night to Remember". The series' cast portrayed the characters from the musical, also with their respective characters of Archie Comics from the series. "A Night to Remember" also made references to the 1976 film.

Miniseries 
In December 2019, Collider reported that a new adaptation, a miniseries, is in development at FX and MGM Television.

Cancelled projects 
A television series which served as a follow-up to the 2002 film was in development, only to be cancelled by NBC due to the 2002 film's low ratings.

Cast and characters 
 A  indicates the actor portrayed the role of a younger version of the character.
 An  indicates an appearance through archival footage.
 A dark gray cell indicates the character was not in the film.

Additional crew and production details

Reception

Box office performance

Critical and public response

Music

Musical 
In 1988, a musical theatre adaptation of Carrie was produced to scathing reviews.  It closed after 16 previews and 5 performances.

Soundtracks

References 

American film series
American supernatural horror films
Mass media franchises introduced in 1976
Film series introduced in 1976
Metro-Goldwyn-Mayer franchises
Carrie
Works based on Cinderella
Horror film franchises